Gilberto Mestrinho de Medeiros Raposo (February 23, 1928 – July 19, 2009) was a Brazilian politician. Mestrinho served as the Governor of the state of Amazonas on three separate occasions.  His first term as Governor was from 1959 until 1963.  His second term in office lasted from 1983 to 1987, while his third term as Governor of Amazonas extended from 1991 until 1995.

Mestrinho also served as the Mayor of Manaus from 1956 until 1958 and a Senator in the Brazilian Senate during his political career.

Gilberto Mestrinho died of lung cancer at the Hospital Prontocord in Manaus, Brazil, on July 19, 2009, at the age of 81. He had been hospitalized for the preceding 15 days due to his deteriorating health. Mestrinho was survived by his wife, Maria Emília Mestrinho, and nine children.

See also
 List of mayors of Manaus

References

1928 births
2009 deaths
Governors of Amazonas (Brazilian state)
Brazilian Democratic Movement politicians
Mayors of Manaus
Members of the Federal Senate (Brazil)
Deaths from lung cancer
Deaths from cancer in Amazonas (Brazilian state)